Marek Fundakowski (born 18 April 1988 in Jasło, Poland) is a Polish footballer who currently plays for Karpaty Krosno. He also played in Krośnianka Krosno, Stal Mielec and SC Young Fellows Juventus.

References

External links 
 

1988 births
Living people
Polish footballers
People from Jasło
Sportspeople from Podkarpackie Voivodeship
Association football forwards
Stal Mielec players
Korona Kielce players
SC Young Fellows Juventus players
Motor Lublin players
ASIL Lysi players
Karpaty Krosno players
Cypriot Second Division players
Polish expatriate footballers
Expatriate footballers in Switzerland
Polish expatriate sportspeople in Switzerland
Expatriate footballers in Cyprus
Polish expatriate sportspeople in Cyprus